The First Unitarian Church of Omaha, Nebraska is a Unitarian Universalist Church located at 3114 Harney Street in the Midtown area.

History 

First Unitarian Church of Omaha was incorporated on August 22, 1869, by twenty-six men and women. Its regular minister was Reverend Henry E. Bond, and its first chapel was a small brick building located at 17th and Cass that was dedicated in 1871. In the fall of 1889 Reverend Newton M. Mann came to serve the church. Mann was the first American minister to promote evolution.

The present Colonial Revival building at 31st and Harney was designed by Omaha architects John McDonald and his son Alan McDonald.  Former U.S. president William Howard Taft, who was then president of the Unitarian Church Conference in the United States and Canada, presided at the 1917 cornerstone-laying ceremony.  The building was dedicated in September 1918.   In the 1930s, Sarah Joslyn gave the church its Aeolian-Skinner pipe organ.

References

External links 

 

National Register of Historic Places in Omaha, Nebraska
Churches in Omaha, Nebraska
19th-century Unitarian Universalist church buildings
Unitarian Universalist churches in Nebraska
Churches on the National Register of Historic Places in Nebraska